Ismael Páez (born September 19, 1950) is a Mexican pool and card player, best known for being the runner-up at the 2000 WPA World Nine-ball Championship.

Career
In September 1998, Ismael Páez defeated German  the Spanish 9-ball Open becoming the second non-European player after Francisco Bustamante to win a Euro Tour tournament. A month later, Páez finished 17th at the 1998 9-Ball World Championship. In July 2000, he reached the final of the 2000 WPA World Nine-ball Championship, after defeating Earl Strickland in the semi-final, but was defeated by Chao Fong-Pang 6–17.

In August 2000, he reached the knockout stages of the World Pool Masters. 9-Ball World Cup 2001 he retired in the round of the last 64 against the Swiss Dimitri Jungoout. In May 2002, Páez took ninth place at the IBC Nanki Classic. In July 2004, he took part in the 2004 WPA World Nine-ball Championship for the last time but lost in the preliminary round.

Titles & achievements
 2001 Jay Swanson Memorial 9-Ball
 1998 Euro Tour Spanish Open 
 1993 South Bay Billiards Open 9-Ball
 1991 Al Romero Classic 9-Ball
 1990 Japan Open 9-Ball
 1989 Las Vegas Open 9-Ball 
 1988 Huebler Cup Open 9-Ball

References

External links

Living people
1950 births
Mexican pool players
Place of birth missing (living people)